The ECCW Hardcore Championship is a hardcore wrestling championship in Elite Canadian Championship Wrestling, a professional wrestling promotion in Vancouver, British Columbia.  The title was first awarded 29 November. 1999.  The title is currently inactive and became so sometime in 2013.

Title history
The title was first awarded to Moondog Manson, following a match pitting him against Ladies Choice on 26 November 1999 in New Westminster, British Columbia.  Both men earned the opportunity to compete for the title by winning two separate hardcore tournaments. Ladies Choice defeated Steve Rizzono in the final of the first tournament, which took place on 19 November 1999 in Campbell River, British Columbia, while Manson earned his spot by defeating Juggernaut in the final of the second tournament on 20 November 1999 in Port Hardy, British Columbia - a match that ran for over 45 minutes.  As the winners of both tournaments, Manson and Ladies Choice became opponents and participants in the inaugural Hardcore Championship match.

Combined reigns

See also

Professional wrestling in Canada
List of National Wrestling Alliance championships

Footnotes

External links
ECCW.com
Canadian Wrestling Archive

Hardcore wrestling championships
National Wrestling Alliance championships
Regional professional wrestling championships
Elite Canadian Championship Wrestling championships